Sansar may refer to:
 Sansar (1951 film), directed by S. S. Vasan
 Sansar (1971 film), directed by Dilip Bose
 Sansar (1975 film), a Turkish film of 1975
 Sansar (1987 film), directed by T. Rama Rao
 Sansar Chand ( 1765–1823), ruler of the state of Kangra
 Sansar (video game), a social virtual reality platform

See also